Abdoulaye Wagne (born October 2, 1981, in Dakar, Senegal) is a Senegalese Olympic athlete competing in the 800 meters with a personal best of 1:45.08.

Competition record

References

1981 births
Living people
Senegalese male middle-distance runners
Athletes (track and field) at the 2004 Summer Olympics
Athletes (track and field) at the 2008 Summer Olympics
Olympic athletes of Senegal
Athletes (track and field) at the 2003 All-Africa Games
Athletes (track and field) at the 2007 All-Africa Games
African Games competitors for Senegal